Eastern College Australia is a non-denominational Christian Private Higher Education and Vocational Education provider in Melbourne, Australia.

Eastern exists to equip individuals through provision of accredited teaching, training and research that contribute to the transformation of church (local and global), society and marketplace through the lives of its graduates.

The college offers a wide range of courses, including Education, Arts, and Theology degrees. The principal is Rev Tim Meyers, and vice principal Dr Angelo Cettolin.

History 
Eastern College Australia, formerly named Tabor Victoria, was established in 1988 as a campus of Tabor College Australia. Their current name was adopted in 2015.

Dr Cheryl McCallum served as principal until December 2017. Cheryl worked at the college for almost 20 years in various capacities including lecturer and Principal. She also worked for TEAR Australia, Urban Neighbours of Hope, and as the National Director for the Australian Evangelical Alliance. Cheryl has served on a number of Boards and Reference groups including TEAR Australia National Board, Australian Evangelical Alliance National Board, The Bible Society in Australia (Victoria) Board, Christian Woman Magazine Reference Board, Micah Challenge Reference Group and the Sophia Think-tank.

Eastern College shared a campus with Stirling Theological College from January 2011 until December 2017. Both colleges offered separate educational awards and while students and staff freely mixed and formal study programs taught separately.

Schools 
Eastern College Australia has three schools. The School of Arts and Social Sciences, School of Education and School of Theology.

School of Arts and Social Sciences 
The goal of the School of Arts and Social Sciences is to provide a broad, flexible education. It includes opportunities for students to develop broad philosophical and theoretical frameworks. It helps provide a base on which to develop task-specific skills and outcomes.

Employers benefit from graduates who have a broad educational experience, strong values, clear personal commitments, and who are socially aware and responsible.

Eastern College Australia has continued to develop its Counselling courses in response to community needs and changes in the counselling profession. Eastern started to offer counselling courses in 1987, with the most recent addition of a Graduate Diploma in Arts, specialising in counselling.

School of Education 
Eastern believes schools are places of change and development for children and young people. Christian teachers make significant impact on the lives of their students showing them something of the love and power of God, as well as helping them understand themselves, develop knowledge and skills and the capacities to live abundant and fruitful lives.

Eastern College Australia provides a Bachelor of Education - Primary or Secondary. As these courses are integrated with each other (Along with the Bachelor of Arts), students can transfer easily from one course to the other in the first two years of study. This provides great flexibility as they recognise that students' early goals can modify as their studies progress.

School of Christian Studies 
Eastern's Christian Studies courses provide in-depth understanding for handling Scripture and deepening spiritual life. All courses introduce students to studies of Scripture and Christian truth, an overview of history and ethics in the light of their history and social context and much more

Graduate-level degrees include: Master of Practical Theology and Master of Transformational Development.

Resource Centre 
The Resource Centre at Eastern College Australia contains over 85,000 items including: reference materials, books and audio-visual materials. In addition Eastern's Resource Centre contains over 55,000 journal issues. The library services faculty and students of Eastern College Australia and Melbourne School of Theology as well as members of the public who take out an individual membership.

References

External links

Seminaries and theological colleges in Australia
Education in Melbourne
Educational institutions established in 1988
1988 establishments in Australia